Lieutenant-General Ali Muhammad Jan Orakzai (Urdu language: على محمدجان اوركزى Pashto language: علي محمد جان یاکزی ), is a retired three-star rank general officer in the Pakistan Army who served as the Corps Commander of XI Corps and the principle commander of the Western Command. As Commander, he commanded all military combat assets and oversaw the peaceful deployment of XI Corps in the Northern Areas and the Federally Administered Tribal Areas (FATA).

Orakzai was the leading army general who led the Pakistan combatant forces in response to the American invasion of Afghanistan as an aftermath of the terrorist attacks in the United States. After retiring from the military he was elevated as the governor of the Khyber-Pakhtunkhwa of Pakistan, from May 2006 until his resignation in January 2008.

Military career
Passing out from Pakistan Military Academy with the 38th PMA Long Course, he was commissioned as a Second lieutenant in 1967 in the 14th Battalion of the Frontier Force Regiment. As Lieutenant, Orakzai had led a Guerrilla company during the Indo-Pakistani War of 1971. In 1976 as a Major, he served as the Forward observer on the Afghanistan-Pakistan border. In 1983, he served as the Aerial observer and intelligence observer on Pakistan's western border. He is a graduate of Command and Staff College and was posted in Generals Headquarters (GHQ) in 1985. He served there as an intelligence analyst for the Pakistan Army. Throughout the 1980s, Orakzai served as an intelligence and military advisor at The GHQ.

As Major General, Orakzai later served as the Commander FCNA in Gilgit. In 1998, still as Major-General, he was the Vice Chief of General Staff at the GHQ. Court-martial Lieutenant-General Ziauddin Butt held Orakzai, responsible for the coup d'état against Former Prime minister Nawaz Sharif.

In April 1999, he was promoted to Lieutenant General and shifted as Adjutant General (AG) to the GHQ. In October 2001, he was made Corps commander of the XI Corps and served as the Commander of the Western Military Command. During his military career, he was the leading and most experienced general who served under the Musharraf Administration. Following the collapse of the Taliban regime in Afghanistan, Orakzai was made the commander of Western Military Command. As commander, he oversaw the extensive military operations led by the United States special operations forces. He responded by deploying hundreds of Mountaineering and Infantry battalions to guard the Pakistan-Afghanistan border, many of whom were redeployed as a result of the 2001 Indian Parliament attack.

In December 2003, he led the XI Corps and several supported administrative divisions of the XII Corps. He served as the principal commander of Pakistan's Western Military Command and supervised the Pakistan Army's quick deployment in Federally Administered Tribal Areas (FATA).  Under his command, the military saw the action Battle of Wana which concluded with Pakistani success.

Post-military career
Soon after the conflict, Orakzai received an honorable discharge from the Army. He was succeeded by Lieutenant General Masood Aslam, who became the principal commander of the Western Military Command of Pakistan Defence Forces.

Immediately after his retirement, Prime Minister Shaukat Aziz appointed him as the Governor of Khyber-Pakhtunkhwa province. According to the BBC as governor, his assignment was to bring stability and security to the FATA region. To complete this task, he sought many peace deals with the local tribal leaders. However, the deals were violated and the violence began in the FATA region. Soon, a bloody tribal conflict between the Pakistan Armed Forces ended the peace deals. A new war in tribal areas ensued. As the conflict grew momentarily, he resigned as the governor. He was replaced by Owais Ahmed Ghani, a former Governor of Balochistan Province.

A tribal Pashtun and as someone who himself belongs to the Federally Administered Tribal Areas, the appointment of Lt. General retired Ali Jan Orakzai as the new Governor of Khyber Pakhtunkhwa was welcomed by tribesmen in FATA. The tribal leaders expressed positive reviews as they had personally known Orakzai. Orakzai sought to end the violence in Khyber and FATA regions. He was one of the pioneers and strongly advocated the Waziristan Accord. According to him, it was a breakthrough and if the treaty proved successful, similar treaties would be signed with tribes in other agencies, Governor Orakzai concluded.

Book
Beyond Tora Bora: The Aurakzai Memoirs, Olympia Publishers, 2017, 370 p.

References

Living people
Pakistani generals
Governors of Khyber Pakhtunkhwa
1947 births
Pashtun people
People from Orakzai District